The Estonia men's national under-16 basketball team is a national basketball team of Estonia, administered  by the Eesti Korvpalliliit. It represents the country in international men's under-16 basketball competitions.

FIBA U16 European Championship participations

See also
Estonia men's national basketball team
Estonia men's national under-18 basketball team
Estonia women's national under-16 basketball team

References

External links
Official website 
Archived records of Estonia team participations

Basketball in Estonia
basketball
Men's national under-16 basketball teams